This is a list of the most expensive transfer fees paid or received by Albanian football clubs.

Record progression

References 

Transfer records
Records
Football transfer
Albania